Alexander Gair Stott (19 April 1925 – 19 December 1998) was a Scottish footballer who played as a centre forward for clubs including Dundee and Partick Thistle.

With Dundee, he finished as the top goalscorer in Scottish Football League Division One in the 1948–49 season, but achieved notoriety in the last match of that season when he had penalty kick saved in a match against Falkirk which Dundee went on to lose, having been in the position where they would win the title with a victory. At Partick, he was the focal point of an attack-focused team which impressed spectators but did not win any trophies.

References

1925 births
1998 deaths
Scottish footballers
People from Monifieth
Footballers from Angus, Scotland
Dundee F.C. players
Hamilton Academical F.C. players
Partick Thistle F.C. players
Portsmouth F.C. players
Scottish Football League players
Scottish league football top scorers
Association football forwards